Benzathine penicillin is an ambiguous nickname for either of the following antibiotics: 

 Benzathine penicillin G (benzathine benzylpenicillin)
 Benzathine penicillin V (benzathine phenoxymethylpenicillin)